Philip "Phil" Cade (June 12, 1916August 28, 2001) was an American amateur auto racer.

Career
Born in Charles City, Iowa, Cade owned and raced a Maserati 250F and Maserati V8RI.  He entered the 1959 United States Grand Prix with his 250F, and though he qualified, was unable to start the race because "his car's engine expired".  Though he stopped regularly racing in 1962, he kept the 250F until 1988, and was still occasionally racing the V8RI into the 1990s.

Death
Cade died on August 28, 2001 in Winchester, Massachusetts.

Complete Formula One results
(key)

References

1916 births
2001 deaths
American Formula One drivers
American racing drivers
people from Charles City, Iowa
racing drivers from Iowa